The following is a list of characters that first appeared in the British soap opera Emmerdale in 1988, by order of first appearance. Sarah Sugden (originally played by Madeleine Howard) first appeared in April, with Dennis Rigg (Richard Franklin) debuting in July. Kate Sugden (Sally Knyvette), and is soon followed by her children, Rachel (Glenda McKay) and Mark Hughes (Craig McKay). Additionally, multiple other characters appeared throughout the year.

Sarah Sugden

Denis Rigg
Denis Rigg, played by Richard Franklin, appeared between 1988 and 1989. He cheats Alan Turner (Richard Thorp) into selling his share of Home Farm to him at a low price. Alan's business partner, Joe Sugden (Frazer Hines), is angry at this and promptly sells his share too. Denis goes on to terrorise the villagers by threatening to evict them all from their homes if they refuse to comply with his demands, since he owns the majority of the houses and farms in the area. Denis looks to Emmerdale Farm to expand his business, and this leads to a confrontation between him and Joe. In the barn, a bull gets aggravated by Denis' threatening and aggressive behaviour, and crushes him against a wall, killing him.

Kate Sugden

Kate Sugden (also Hughes), played by Sally Knyvette, made her first appearance on 24 August 1988. The character was introduced by new series producer Stuart Doughty, who wanted the serial to feel more up to date. Divorcée Kate and her teenage children were considered "outsiders" and not used to country life, which challenged the Sugden's way of life. 

Kate arrives in the village with her two children Rachel Hughes (Glenda McKay) and Mark Hughes (Craig McKay) following her divorce from David Hughes (Martyn Whitby). She clashes with Joe Sugden (Frazer Hines) after he shoots her dog; they eventually fell in love. She marries Joe later that year despite opposition from Rachel and Mark. Kate quits her job as a waitress and buys Matt Skilbeck's (Frederick Pyne) share of Emmerdale Farm. After arguing with Rachel's lover Pete Whiteley (Jim Millea), Kate has several drinks at The Woolpack and accidentally runs down and kills Pete with her car. Kate receives a two-year prison sentence for manslaughter. When she is released from prison 12 months later, she tries to reconcile her marriage with Joe, but they are unable to make it work, so Kate ends their marriage. Realising there is nothing left in Beckindale for her, Kate leaves the village for her home city of Sheffield. Rachel and Mark stay with Joe in Emmerdale. Kate does not attend Mark's funeral, after he dies in a plane crash. A few years later, Kate dies off-screen of a brain haemorrhage.

Rachel Hughes

Rachel Hughes, played by Glenda McKay, arrives in Beckindale in 1988 with her mother Kate (Sally Knyvette) and brother Mark (Craig McKay). Rachel discovers she is pregnant, and gives birth to son Joe, on the same day her former stepfather died, naming her son in his honour. In 1998, Rachel begins dating schoolteacher Graham Clark (Kevin Pallister) and he begins to exert control over her, by getting her to dye her hair and dress like his late wife Rebecca. Graham takes Rachel on a picnic, where she tries to end their relationship. When Graham tries to force himself on her, Rachel tries to flee but he corners her on a clifftop. Rachel then informs Graham that she knows he killed his wife; Graham panics and pushes Rachel off the cliff to her death. In 2017, Rachel and Chris' son Joseph Tate (now Ned Porteous) returns to the village under the false name Tom Waterhouse to get revenge on Charity Dingle (Emma Atkins). Joseph talks about Rachel's death and how he doesn't remember her.

Mark Hughes

Mark Hughes, played by Craig McKay, first appears on 7 September 1988. He is introduced as the 15-year-old son of Kate (Sally Knyvette), alongside sister Rachel (Glenda McKay). He becomes a troublesome teenager, which coincided with his mother's relationship and subsequent marriage to Joe Sugden (Frazer Hines). Mark runs away from home after Kate announces her intention to move in with Joe. He intends to go to Germany to be with his father, but only makes it as far as Hull. His father David (Martyn Whitby) alerts Kate, who brings Mark home.

When he goes to the pub with his sister and her older friends, he wants to prove he is mature by drinking alcohol, but is cautioned for underage drinking. Mark then begins shoplifting. He steals items he does not need, and is eventually caught by Rachel and Sarah Connolly (Madeleine Howard). He is subsequently arrested and given a warning at the police station, meanwhile, his mother collapses and suffers a miscarriage; Mark blames himself for this. After leaving school, Mark initially intends to join the army and follow in his father's footsteps. However, he decides to stay at school and study A-Levels in Art, Technical Drawing and English. However, he refuses to turn up to his final exams and as a result, loses his place at Glasgow University. Mark then gets himself into debt by letting his friends use telephone chatlines, and he has to get a job at the Woolpack to pay them off. Mark dies in the 1993 plane crash that affects the village. Mark is crushed by a falling wall, and Jack Sugden (Clive Hornby) identifies his body after recognising his watch amongst recovered items.

Other characters

References

, Emmerdale
1988